Albert-Marie Joseph Cyrille de Monléon (20 January 1934 - 29 April 2019) was a French Roman Catholic bishop.

De Monléon was born in France and was ordained to the priesthood in 1964. He served as bishop of the Roman Catholic Diocese of Pamiers from 1988 to 1999 and served as bishop of the Roman Catholic Diocese of Meaux from 1999 to 2012.

Notes

External links

1934 births
2019 deaths
Bishops of Pamiers
Bishops of Meaux